HR 3831, also known as HD 83368, is a binary star system in the southern constellation of Vela at a distance of 233 light years. This object is barely visible to the naked eye as a dim, blue star with an apparent visual magnitude of 6.232. It is approaching the Earth with a heliocentric radial velocity of 4.0 km/s. 

The star system is a visual binary with a 3.29″ projected separation, identified as such in 2002. The larger star, HD 83368A, is a pulsating variable of a rapidly oscillating Ap type. It has a single yet strongly distorted dipole pulsation mode with a frequency of 1427 µHz. The primary star is chemically peculiar, exhibiting spots of enhanced concentrations of lithium, europium and oxygen.

See also
Vela (Chinese astronomy)

References

A-type main-sequence stars
F-type main-sequence stars
Binary stars
Ap stars
Rapidly oscillating Ap stars
Vela (constellation)
CD-48 4831
83368
047145
3831
J09362541-4845042